Stigmella cocciferae is a moth of the family Nepticulidae. It is found from Greece to Turkey and Israel.

The wingspan is 4.9–7 mm. Adults are on wing from April to July and again from September to October.

The larvae feed on Quercus coccifera. They mine the leaves of their host plant. The mine consists of a broad corridor. The frass is found in a broad band.

External links
Fauna Europaea
bladmineerders.nl
The Quercus Feeding Stigmella Species Of The West Palaearctic: New Species, Key And Distribution (Lepidoptera: Nepticulidae)

Nepticulidae
Moths of Europe
Moths of Asia
Moths described in 2003